The Dakoid languages are a branch of the Northern Bantoid languages spoken in Taraba and Adamawa states of eastern Nigeria.

Languages
Gaa–Dong
Donga (Dong)
Gaa (Tiba)
Daka–Taram
Taram
Daka (a dialect cluster of Dirim, Samba, Lamja, Dengsa, and Tola).

Classification
Greenberg placed Samba Daka (Daka) within his Adamawa proposal, as group G3, but Bennett (1983) demonstrated to general satisfaction that it is a Benue–Congo language, though its placement within Benue–Congo is disputed. Blench (2010) considers it to be Benue–Congo. Boyd (ms), however, considers Daka an isolate branch within Niger–Congo (Blench 2008).

Dong (Donga), though clearly Niger–Congo, is difficult to classify. There is no published data on Gaa (Tiba), and Taram (listed as a dialect of Daka by Ethnologue) is only known from data collected in 1931 (Blench 2008).

Names and locations
Below is a list of language names, populations, and locations from Blench (2019).

Footnotes

References
Blench (2008) Prospecting proto-Plateau. Manuscript.
 Blench, Roger, 2011. 'The membership and internal structure of Bantoid and the border with Bantu'. Bantu IV, Humboldt University, Berlin.

Northern Bantoid languages
Languages of Nigeria
Proposed language families